The 2012 FIVB Women's World Olympic Qualification Tournament is a qualification tournament to determine the remaining four competitor spots for Volleyball at the 2012 Summer Olympics. The event also doubles as the Asian Olympic Qualification Tournament; the best three teams plus the best Asian team (outside the top-three ranking) will compete in the 2012 Summer Olympics.

Host nation Japan are joined by the three best-ranked teams from the Asian Continental Championship, plus (according to the FIVB World Rankings, as of 4 January 2012) the two best-ranked teams from Confédération Européenne de Volleyball (CEV) that did not qualify in the European qualification tournament, the best-ranked team from North, Central America and Caribbean Volleyball Confederation (NORCECA) that did not qualify in the NORCECA qualification tournament, and the best-ranked team from Confederación Sudamericana de Voleibol (CSV) or Confédération Africaine de Volleyball (CAVB) that did not qualify in the respective qualification tournament.

Qualified teams
Host nation

Qualified through 2011 Asian Women's Volleyball Championship

Qualified through FIVB World Rankings as of 4 January 2012
 (as CEV 1 – no. 6)
 (as CEV 2 – no. 7)
 (as NORCECA 1 – no. 10)
 (as CSV 1 or CAVB 1 – no. 17)
Venue:  Tokyo Metropolitan Gymnasium, Tokyo, Japan
Dates: 19–27 May 2012
All times are Japan Standard Time (UTC+09:00).

 – Replacing Kenya, which had a better world ranking (no. 15) but withdrew.

Standings
The competition system for the tournament is the single Round-Robin system. Each team plays once against each of the 7 remaining teams. Points are accumulated during the whole tournament, and the final ranking is determined by the total points gained.

|}

Results

Day 1

|}

Day 2

|}

Day 3

|}

Day 4

|}

Day 5

|}

Day 6

|}

Day 7

|}

Individual awards

Best Scorer

Best Spiker

Best Blocker

Best Server

Best Digger

Best Setter

Best Receiver

Best Libero

Controversy
The last game of the tournament which Japan lost to Serbia 2–3 was controversial in that it was allegedly a fixed match. The FIVB then conducted an investigation into whether the Japanese women's team deliberately lost against Serbia before concluding that there was no evidence to prove the existence of match fixing.

Background
Before the controversial match Japan had gained 11 points to put them in 5th place, while Serbia had 12 points placing them 3rd.

|}

For the last game, the qualification outcome could be fallen into one of these three scenarios.

 If Japan beats Serbia by any score, then Japan and Thailand (as the best Asian team) will qualify.
 If Japan is beaten by 0–3 or 1–3, then Serbia and Thailand (as the best Asian team) will qualify.
 If Japan is beaten by 2–3, then Serbia and Japan (as the best Asian team) will qualify.

Match details and consequences

In the 1st set, Japan took an 8–5 edge at the first technical time out. After that Serbia leveled the score at 10–10. Erika Araki spiked to let Japan led 16–14 at the second TTO and then drilled a spike right down the middle to give Japan the set 25–18. Serbia returned to claim the 2nd set 21–25. Japan came back on the 3rd set with a 10-point lead, then 16–6, 18–8, 20–10 and 22–12 before closing the set 25–19. After the 3rd set, Japan had qualified for 2012 Summer Olympics, so they didn't have to play seriously. However in the 4th set, Japan was up 19–16 before Serbia made 6 consecutive points, ending with a win for Serbia at 21–25.

After the match, Masayoshi Manabe, coach of Japan, released a statement.

We knew this was the last day. Everybody was nervous. We knew we had to get two sets. Yoshie Takeshita is ill from mental and physical exhaustion after this match. We told the players at the morning meeting that we had to give it full power tonight. We have to work on our serve reception in the two months leading up to the Olympics.

Serbia's win also meant it qualified ahead of Thailand, which aimed to reach the Olympics for the first time. Had Japan beaten Serbia, Thailand would have also won a ticket to London along with Japan. But, in this case, Japan would have been placed in a tough group in London alongside defending champions Brazil, the world number-one United States, Asian champions China and the new European force Turkey. Thai captain, Wilavan Apinyapong, was disappointed but said that the Olympic Games remained their ultimate dream and everything.

Investigation

On May 28, 2012, the day after the match, the FIVB by Wei Jizhong released this statement

The FIVB has investigated the allegation of match fixing. The conclusion of the FIVB control committee in place is that there is no evidence to prove the existence of match fixing. The reports received from the national federations of Japan and Serbia told us the same. Some witnesses in attendance at the match gave the same judgement.

The FIVB also said that it stood firmly against match fixing and would revise the system of future Olympics qualifiers to reduce even further the possibility of any manipulation.

Reaction

Some media suspected the investigation result and said that something didn’t seem right. Thai social media sites were bombarded with messages expressing dissatisfaction over the judgement and a Japanese volleyball official insisted that the allegation was unfounded.

References

External links
 Official website
 Qualification process

FIVB women
Olympic qualification women
Vol